Brachydeutera argentata is a species of shore flies in the family Ephydridae found in the United States.

References

Ephydridae
Insects described in 1852
Taxa named by Francis Walker (entomologist)
Diptera of North America